Hakea tephrosperma  commonly known as  hooked needlewood, is a shrub or small tree species in the family Proteaceae. It has cream flowers, needle-shaped leaves and is one of the taller species adaptable for dry to temperate locations.

Description
The smaller branches are rusty coloured with flat silky hairs or may be densely covered with short white, woolly, soft matted hairs. The pedicel and perianth are white and red-brown with fine soft matted hairs. Racemes of cream flowers appear in the leaf axils between September and October.

Taxonomy and naming
Hakea tephrosperma was first formally described in 1830 by botanist Robert Brown in Supplementum primum prodromi florae Novae Hollandiae. The specific epithet (tephrosperma) is derived from the Ancient Greek words tephros meaning "ash-coloured" and sperma meaning "seed"  referring to the colour of the seed.

Distribution and habitat
Hooked needlewood is a widespread species occurring in drier areas of  Queensland, New South Wales, Victoria and South Australia. Grows in open spinifex and blue-bush (Maireana species) shrubland as an individual tree or in dense thickets on coarse soils. The hooked needlewood is an adaptable species for dry to temperate locations but rarely seen in cultivation.

References

tephrosperma
Flora of New South Wales
Flora of Queensland
Flora of South Australia
Flora of Victoria (Australia)
Plants described in 1830
Taxa named by Robert Brown (botanist, born 1773)